Torgun is a rural locality (a settlement) and the administrative center of Torgunskoye Rural Settlement, Staropoltavsky District, Volgograd Oblast, Russia. The population was 752 as of 2010. There are 13 streets.

Geography 
Torgun is located in steppe, on Transvolga, on the left bank of the Vodyanka River, 64 km southeast of Staraya Poltavka (the district's administrative centre) by road. Verkhnyaya Vodyanka is the nearest rural locality.

References 

Rural localities in Staropoltavsky District